Nicole Maestracci (13 February 1951 – 7 April 2022) was a French lawyer and magistrate. She was a member of the Constitutional Council between 2013 and 2022. She died on 7 April 2022 at the age of 71.

References

1951 births
2022 deaths
Lawyers from Paris
French people of Corsican descent
Chevaliers of the Légion d'honneur